St. Patrick Street may refer to:

St. Patrick's Street, a shopping street in Cork, Ireland
St. Patrick Street, a street in Ottawa, Canada connecting to the Royal Alexandra Interprovincial Bridge